Jacintha ("Cintha") Hedwig Jeanne Boersma (born 1 May 1969 in Amsterdam, North Holland) is a retired volleyball player from the Netherlands, who represented her native country at two consecutive Summer Olympics, starting in 1992. 

Boersma was a member of the Netherlands national team that won the gold medal at the 1995 European Championship by defeating Croatia 3–0 in the final. She was considered the most valuable player at the Atlanta Games.

On club level she played with Jogging Altamura in Italy.

Her brother is beach volleyball player Emiel Boersma.

References
  Dutch Olympic Committee

1969 births
Dutch women's volleyball players
Volleyball players at the 1992 Summer Olympics
Volleyball players at the 1996 Summer Olympics
Olympic volleyball players of the Netherlands
Sportspeople from Amsterdam
Living people
Dutch expatriate sportspeople in Italy
Expatriate volleyball players in Italy